The Rogues Gallery is an accessory for the first edition of the Advanced Dungeons & Dragons fantasy role-playing game.

Contents
The Rogues Gallery is a supplement for the Dungeon Master containing hundreds of non-player character listings, with characters from each of the first edition AD&D character classes, and game statistics for characters originally played in Gary Gygax's home Dungeons & Dragons campaign.

Publication history
The Rogues Gallery was written by Brian Blume with Dave Cook and Jean Wells, with a cover by Erol Otus and interior illustrations by Jeff Dee and Otus, and was published by TSR in 1980 as a 48-page book. TSR Stock # 9031. .

The 2nd Edition "Rogues Gallery" was published by TSR in 1992 as an unbound sheaf of papers suitable for use in a binder. REF6 Accessory. TSR Stock # 9380. Retail price was US$12.95.  .

Reception

Reviews

References

Dungeons & Dragons sourcebooks
Role-playing game supplements introduced in 1980